Muhamed Fazlagić (17 April 1967), known as Fazla, is a singer from Bosnia and Herzegovina.

Eurovision Song Contest 1993
In 1993, Fazla represented Bosnia and Herzegovina at the 1993 Eurovision Song Contest with the song "Sva bol svijeta". Fazla finished in sixteenth place with 27 points.

See also
List of Bosnia and Herzegovina patriotic songs

References

1967 births
Living people
Musicians from Sarajevo
20th-century Bosnia and Herzegovina male singers
Eurovision Song Contest entrants for Bosnia and Herzegovina
Eurovision Song Contest entrants of 1993
Hayat Production artists
Bosniaks of Bosnia and Herzegovina